Aubbeenaubbee Township is one of eight townships in Fulton County, Indiana. As of the 2010 census, its population was 1,448 and it contained 728 housing units.

Geography
King Lake is in this township.

Unincorporated towns
 Delong
 Leiters Ford
(This list is based on USGS data and may include former settlements.)

Adjacent townships
 Union Township, Marshall County (north)
 Richland Township (east)
 Rochester Township (southeast)
 Union Township (south)
 Harrison Township, Pulaski County (southwest)
 Tippecanoe Township, Pulaski County (west)
 North Bend Township, Starke County (northwest)

Major highways
  Indiana State Road 17
  Indiana State Road 110
  Indiana State Road 117

Cemeteries
The township contains two cemeteries: Independent Order of Odd Fellows and Moon.

References
 
 United States Census Bureau cartographic boundary files

External links
 Indiana Township Association
 United Township Association of Indiana

Townships in Fulton County, Indiana
Townships in Indiana